Olga Gontar (born January 11, 1979, in Minsk, Belarus) is a Belarusian individual rhythmic gymnast. She is the 1995 Grand Prix Final all-around bronze medalist and the 1993 European Junior all-around champion.

Career 
Gontar started competitive rhythmic gymnastics at 4 years old. In 1991, at age 12, she won the first of three consecutive all-around titles at the Schmiden International. She then took the all-around gold at the 1993 European Junior Championships, and also came in first on both ball and ribbon and was second with rope.

Gontar debuted as a senior in the 1994 season. 1995 was her last and busiest year in rhythmic. She won bronze in the all-around at the 1995 Grand Prix Final, in the event finals; she won gold in rope (tied with Olena Vitrychenko and Yanina Batyrchina) and bronze in ribbon. Before she could compete at the World Championships, reports surfaced that a back injury was forcing her out and would be the deciding factor in her early retirement from the sport at the atypically young age of 16.

After she completed her career in rhythmic gymnastics, Gontar briefly made a modeling career appearing in print ads and magazine covers for European luxury brands in Milan and Paris.

External links
 

1979 births
Living people
Belarusian rhythmic gymnasts
Medalists at the Rhythmic Gymnastics European Championships
Gymnasts from Minsk
20th-century Belarusian women